Chang Kai (born August 1964) is a Chinese physicist currently serving as research fellow at the Institute of Semiconductors, Chinese Academy of Sciences (CAS).

Biography
Chang was born in Qianshan, Anhui in August 1964. In 1984 he graduated from Fuyang Normal University. In 1986 he graduated from Beijing Normal University, earning his Doctor of Science degree. He was a postdoc at the State Key Laboratory of Superlattice, Institute of Semiconductors of the Chinese Academy of Sciences (CAS). In 1998 he became a visiting scholar at the University of Antwerp in Belgium, he remained there until 2001. He is now a research fellow at the Institute of Semiconductors, Chinese Academy of Sciences (CAS).

Honours and awards
 2004 State Natural Science Award (Second Class)
 2013 Huang Kun Solid State and Semiconductor Physics Award
 2019 Academician of the Chinese Academy of Sciences (CAS)

References

1964 births
People from Qianshan, Anhui
Living people
Fuyang Normal University alumni
Beijing Normal University alumni
Physicists from Anhui
Members of the Chinese Academy of Sciences